Yorgan De Castro (born December 19, 1987) is a Cape Verdean mixed martial artist who competes in the Heavyweight division of Professional Fighters League (PFL). He is most notable for fighting in the Ultimate Fighting Championship (UFC).

Background 
Castro was born and raised in the island of St. Vincent, Cape Verde.
At 18 years old he moved to Portugal and started kickboxing training, making his official fighting debut only 6 months after. He dreamed of one day fighting in the big kickboxing promotions K-1 and Glory but never believed it would be possible in Portugal.

Later moving to the US to be with his family, his uncle convinced him to train at Lauzon MMA, owned by the current UFC Fighter Joe Lauzon, where he discovered MMA and started training.

Mixed martial arts career

Early career

Starting his career in 2017, Castro compiled a 4-0 record fighting mainly for CES MMA. He was invited on Dana White's Contender Series 17 in order to compete for a UFC contract, which successfully gained through a TKO victory against Sanford Alton Meeks

Ultimate Fighting Championship

Castro made his UFC debut at UFC 243 on October 6, 2019 against Justin Tafa. He won the fight in the first round via knockout. This win earned him the Performance of the Night bonus as well.

Castro was initially scheduled to face Greg Hardy on March 28, 2020 at UFC on ESPN: Ngannou vs. Rozenstruik. Due to the COVID-19 pandemic, the event was eventually postponed . However, on April 9, Dana White, the president of UFC announced that this event was postponed and the bout eventually took place on May 9, 2020. Castro lost the fight via unanimous decision.

Castro was briefly linked to a heavyweight bout on October 4, 2020 with Ben Sosoli at UFC on ESPN: Holm vs. Aldana. However, Sosoli pulled out of the fight in late July citing an eye surgery and was replaced by Carlos Felipe. He lost the fight via unanimous decision.

Castro faced Jarjis Danho on April 10, 2021 at UFC on ABC 2. He lost the fight via knockout in the first round.

On April 30, 2021, it was revealed that Castro was no longer with the UFC.

Post UFC

Castro was scheduled to make his first appearance after his UFC release against Rakim Cleveland on August 6, 2021 at CES 63. However, Castro announced that he had withdrawn from the bout due to family issues.

Castro faced Danyelle Williams on November 7, 2021 at CES 65. He won the bout via unanimous decision.

Eagle Fighting Championship 
Castro signed a multi-fight contract with Eagle Fighting Championship and debuted against Shaun Asher on January 28, 2022 at Eagle FC 44. He won the fight via guillotine choke in the first round.

Castro headlined against Junior dos Santos on May 20, 2022 at Eagle FC 47. Castro won the fight via TKO in the third round due to a doctor stoppage after dos Santos suffered a shoulder injury and was unable to continue.

Professional Fighters League 
Castro signed with PFL for the 2023 season, starting off against Ante Delija on April 7, 2023 at PFL 2.

Personal life 
Yorgan de Castro has stated that if he had to pick a hero, it would be Daniel Cormier due to his figure (short range and size) for the heavyweight division and unbelievable talent and determination. Yorgan is married and has a daughter born in 2014.

Championships and accomplishments

Mixed martial arts
Ultimate Fighting Championship
Performance of the Night (One time)

Mixed martial arts record

|-
|Win
|align=center|9–3
|Junior dos Santos
|TKO (shoulder Injury)
|Eagle FC 47
|
|align=center|3
|align=center|0:33
|Miami, Florida, United States
|
|-
|Win
|align=center|8–3
|Shaun Asher
|Submission (guillotine choke)
|Eagle FC 44
|
|align=center|1
|align=center|1:04
|Miami, Florida, United States
|
|-
| Win
| align=center| 7–3
|Danyelle Williams
| Decision (unanimous)
| CES 65
| 
| align=center|3
| align=center|5:00
|Providence, Rhode Island, United States
|
|-
| Loss
| align=center| 6–3
|Jarjis Danho
|KO (punch)
|UFC on ABC: Vettori vs. Holland
|
|align=center|1
|align=center|3:02
|Las Vegas, Nevada, United States
|
|-
| Loss
| align=center| 6–2
| Carlos Felipe
| Decision (unanimous)
| UFC on ESPN: Holm vs. Aldana
| 
| align=center| 3
| align=center| 5:00
| Abu Dhabi, United Arab Emirates
| 
|-
| Loss
| align=center| 6–1
| Greg Hardy
| Decision (unanimous)
| UFC 249
| 
| align=center|3
| align=center|5:00
| Jacksonville, Florida, United States
|
|-
| Win
| align=center| 6–0
| Justin Tafa
| KO (punch)
| UFC 243 
| 
| align=center|1
| align=center|2:10
| Melbourne, Australia
| 
|-
| Win
| align=center| 5–0
| Sanford Alton Meeks
| TKO (leg kick and punches)
| Dana White's Contender Series 17
| 
| align=center| 1
| align=center| 4:45
| Las Vegas, Nevada, United States
|
|-
| Win
| align=center|4–0
| Carlton Little Sr.
| Decision (unanimous)
| CES MMA 54
| 
| align=center|3
| align=center|5:00
| Lincoln, Rhode Island, United States
|
|-
| Win
| align=center|3–0
| Ras Hylton
| KO (punch)
| NEF 36
| 
| align=center|1
| align=center|2:36
| Portland, Maine, United States
|
|-
| Win
| align=center|2–0
| David White
| TKO (punches)
| CES MMA 50 
| 
| align=center|3
| align=center|2:20
| Lincoln, Rhode Island, United States
|
|-
| Win
| align=center|1–0
| James Dysard
| TKO (punches)
| CES MMA 47
| 
| align=center|1
| align=center|0:39
| Lincoln, Rhode Island, United States
|

See also 
 List of current PFL fighters
 List of male mixed martial artists

References

External links 
  
 

1987 births
Living people
Heavyweight mixed martial artists
Mixed martial artists utilizing kickboxing
Ultimate Fighting Championship male fighters
People from Mindelo
Cape Verdean male mixed martial artists
Portuguese male mixed martial artists
Cape Verdean emigrants to Portugal